Ștefan Ardeleanu (born 1940) is a Romanian fencer and coach.

Career

Ardeleanu took up fencing with coach Alexandru Csipler at local clubs Unio, then Olimpia Satu Mare, before transferring to CSA Steaua București under coach Vasile Chelaru. He won the 1965 junior national championship in sabre, then switched to foil. With Ion Drîmbă, Iuliu Falb, Tănase Mureșanu and Mihai Țiu, he earned Romania's first team world title in fencing at the 1967 World Fencing Championships in Montreal.

After his retirement as a fencer, he began a fencing coach career at CS Triumful in Bucharest. He assisted Ștefan Haukler as coach of the national woman's foil team from 1978 to 1980, before becoming principal coach. In 1992 he settled in Kuwait, then came back in 1998 to CS Satu Mare.

Ardeleanu is married to foil fencer Suzana Ardeleanu.

References

Bibliography
  Ștefan Stahl, Scrima sătmăreană. Miracol al sportului românesc, EuroPrint, Satu Mare, 2014

1940 births
Living people
Romanian female foil fencers
Romanian male sabre fencers
Sportspeople from Satu Mare